The Marsh is a 2006 horror film directed by Jordan Barker and written by Michael Stokes.  It stars Gabrielle Anwar as a children's book author haunted by a recurring nightmare and Forest Whitaker as a paranormal investigator she enlists to help her.

Plot 
Successful children's author Claire Holloway (Gabrielle Anwar) is troubled by nightmares, for which she is seeing a psychiatrist. While watching television, she sees the Rose Marsh Farm in Westmoreland County, which resembles a location in her nightmares. She decides to spend her vacation at the farm, which is located near a swamp. She is haunted by the ghosts of a little girl (Niamh Wilson) and a teenage boy inside the house. She befriends local newspaper publisher and historian Noah Pitney (Justin Louis). After more disturbing visions, she contacts paranormal consultant Geoffrey Hunt (Forest Whitaker). Together they investigate the farm and uncover a tragedy that happened there twenty years earlier.

Cast
Gabrielle Anwar as Claire Holloway
Justin Louis as Noah Pitney
Forest Whitaker as Geoffrey Hunt
Peter MacNeill as Philip Manville
Niamh Wilson as Little Claire/Rose
Joe Dinicol as Brendan Manville
Brooke Johnson as Mercy
Kenner Ames as Ernie
Jessica Greco as Teen Mercy
Ryan Giesen as Teen Pitney
Bill MacDonald as Dr. Wells

Release
The film had limited theatrical release. It was first released in May 2006; on October 21, 2006 it was screened at the Screamfest Horror Film Festival in Los Angeles.

References

External links 
 
 The Marsh (2007) at Rotten Tomatoes

2006 films
2006 horror films
2000s English-language films